Central Presbyterian Church is an historic church located at 46 Park Street in Montclair, New Jersey, United States.

The current church building was built in 1921 and held its dedication ceremony on Oct. 15, 1922. Over six decades later, Central Presbyterian Church was added to the National Register of Historic Places in 1986.

The building was designed by architecture firms Carrere & Hastings and Shreve, Lamb & Harmon. Carrère and Hastings also designed the New York Public Library.  
The church's architecture reflects the simplicity of New England Colonial style with the Georgian style of many English churches. The church's spire was designed as a tribute to the hope and faith of the congregation, not to mention the many hands that helped build it.

There is seating capacity for 600 people on the main floor and 340 in the balcony. Next door is the adjoining church house, which was built for the many social and religious activities the church fostered. A large gym on the second floor hosted many basketball games and a proscenium stage was designed to host church plays and benefits. Downstairs, the Guild Room was, according to Reverend Wylie,  devoted to the Women's Guild as a “rallying center, a place of beauty of  inspiration and devotion.”

Early history 
The history of Central Presbyterian Church is entwined with the history of Montclair, NJ and the history of the Presbyterian Church in the United States.  Although Central's official beginning is 1837, when the first cornerstone was laid, Central's origins reach back to 1667 when four men, Jasper Crane, Robert Treat, John Treat and John Curtis successfully requested and were granted land to freely practice their religious beliefs. King Charles II of England granted “letters patent” for a New Jersey colony. The four men, part of a group of 23 colonists, moved from Branford, Connecticut to the new colony “at Newark on the Passaic”.

1667 - The Church in Newark 
Jasper Crane, a member of the prestigious Crane family of Montclair, was one of the original founders of the church in Newark, NJ. Dedicated on January 20, 1667, the church was 36 feet by 36 feet and was located on Broad Street south of Market Street. By 1706, the church was predominantly known as a Presbyterian church. In 1708, a much larger church of stone with a steeple and a bell was built. Throughout the 1700s, the colonists traveled 8 or more miles by foot or by horse to attend the Newark church. They came from the Oranges, the ‘Mountain’ as Montclair was called, and Bloomfield to hear their Sunday sermon.  

While the Newark church was growing, the framework of the Presbyterian church was also taking shape. The first written record of the General Presbytery dates to 1705. By 1717, the First Synod, organized in Philadelphia, Pennsylvania, included four Presbyteries: Philadelphia, New Castle, Snow Hill and Long Island.

In 1776, war broke out between the colonists and England. The colonists longed for independence from the Mother Country. Presbyterians have long been considered primarily responsible for the American Revolution in 1776:

Presbyterians were very involved in the American Revolution. In numbers, they were one of the most dominant national groups. They had migrated from Scotland and from the north of Ireland because of wars with the English kings; and persecutions developed by the English rulers.

The war continued for seven years until 1783, when colonists won the American Revolution. Religious freedom was integral to the newly independent, self-governing United States of America. In 1794, the first Presbyterian General Assembly began its Sessions.

In 1794, desiring their own local church, Bloomfield and Cranetown residents (as Montclair was called at that time) petitioned the Presbytery for a separate society located in Bloomfield. On October 20, 1796, “The Presbyterian Society of Bloomfield” was born. On May 8, 1797, the cornerstone was laid in Bloomfield. The church bell was presented by Major Nathaniel Crane. Major Bloomfield gave $140.00, and Mrs. Bloomfield donated a Bible and Psalm book for the pulpit.

Isaac Dodd was elected President of the Society. Samuel Ward, Ephraim Morris, Oliver Crane and Joseph Davis were trustees. The original subscribers who agreed to hire a minister for six months included the following Cranetown residents:

Oliver Crane, Stephen Fordham, William Crane, Simeon Crane, Widow Susanna Crane, Job Crane, Isaac Tomkins, Phineas Crane, Widow Dorcas Williams, David Riker, Samuel McChesney, Samuel Ward, John Vincent, Noah Crane, Jr., Noah Crane, Phebe Dod, James Gubs, Jr., Joseph Crane, John Baldwin, Nathaniel Dod, Israel Crane, Caleb Martin, Aaron Crane, Reuben Dod, Lewis Baldwin, Nathaniel Crane, Isaac Mitchell, Benjamin Crane, Eliakim Crane, Elizabeth Rouge, Thomas Force, William Holmes, Daniel Ougheltree, Levi Vincent, Cornelius Vincent, John Smith, Henry Shoemaker, John Fry, Widow Jane Crane, Zadok Crane, Samuel Tichenor, Peter Davis and Matthew Dod.

1837 – The Presbyterian Society of West Bloomfield 
“Resolved that it is expedient to build a church in this place.”   According to the Session Record dated August 31, 1837, this resolution officially marked the beginning of the Central Presbyterian Church of Montclair. A board of trustees and officers, elected at a meeting at the local schoolhouse, started planning for a Presbyterian society for West Bloomfield, the township informally known as Cranetown that later, in 1870, was officially recognized as Montclair.

Despite the severe national economic downturn in 1837, when banks failed and bankruptcies were rife across America, “The Presbyterian Society of West Bloomfield” was born and a new church was built. The schoolhouse already on the property was renovated. Its second story was removed and the school rooms were refinished for social meetings and Sunday school. The church was made of wood and built over these rooms. The church was located in the center of town, on a triangular-shaped block bordered by Bloomfield Avenue, Park Street and Church Street. Almost one year later to the day, on August 9, 1838, the church was formally dedicated.

A $10,000 bequest by Major Nathaniel Crane provided the bedrock for the initial funding for the church. The committee and trustees included: Amos Crane, Eliam B. Crane, James Crane, Zenas S. Crane, Dr. Isaac D. Dodd, Jared E. Harrison, John Munn, Captain Joseph Munn, Cyrus Pierson, and William Smith. Decatur Harrison, an architect and Cranetown resident, designed the renovations and extensions.

The church cost $3,196.95 in addition to the $400 spent for the lot. Burial plots to the cemetery adjoining the church were sold to offset the deficit. The new church boasted 71 members and pews were sold for $25-$90 per year to offset the annual budget.

The Reverend Samuel Ware Fischer, son of one of New Jersey's noted preachers, was unanimously elected by Session to serve as the church's first pastor. He served from 1839 to 1849 and later served as President of Hamilton College. His initial salary, $7.00 per week, was eventually increased to $700 per year.  In 1843, the chorister, Calvin S. Baldwin was paid $40 per year.

The first Session members were Mathias Smith, Elias Crane, Isaac B. Wheeler, and Moses Stiles. The first clerk of Session, John Munn, remained at this post for 25 years. The early records of the church were pristinely maintained by John Munn's fastidious attention to detail.

1856 – The First Presbyterian Church of Montclair – “Old First” 
By 1856, the church membership's growth dictated the necessity for a larger building. The new building was built in back of the old one with $16,000 in subscriptions, stone from local freestone quarries, and the prayers, visions and hard work of many. Miss Mary Crane, Israel Crane's daughter, donated the 1,084 pound bell tuned in the Key of G and made at the foundry of Messrs. Jones & Hitchcock in Troy, New York.

By 1860, there were 85 families and 196 communicants. Pews cost $65-$340 per year and were sold to the highest bidder. Although Reverend Job Foster Halsey organized the building of the new larger church, a supply pastor, the Reverend Silas Billings officiated at the building's dedication. The church's new name: The First Presbyterian Church of Montclair.

The Civil War years and beyond 
From 1858 to 1861, Reverend Josiah Addison Priest served but resigned at the outbreak of the Civil War. During the Civil War years, from 1862 to 1867, the Reverend Nelson Millard served. Reverend Millard denounced slavery and supported the Union. His sermons were infused with political ideology.

At one point during his service, he took a leave of absence to serve as a senior member of the Christian Commission in Richmond, Virginia. He was charged with reestablishing local government and providing food and medical services to the war-ravaged area.

After the Civil War, the church's growth reflected the town's rapidly expanding population. By 1870, Montclair's population reached 2,583, and the State Legislature authorized the town's name change to Montclair.

By the end of 1867, the congregation had grown to 300 members with a subscription of $4,101. The church bought the school next door and expanded the church to accommodate 700 people. In 1868, the new Township of Montclair's first board meeting was held in the church's lecture room.

The church's membership continued to grow. From 1870 -1887, despite a split of members to organize the Congregational Church, 532 persons joined. The Reverend Doctor J. Romeyn Barry led the congregation at First. The growth in spirituality corresponded with an enormous increase in giving. $50,000 of debt was liquidated, a stone chapel was built on Church Street, and $10,000 was set aside to build a parsonage. The congregation was so delighted with the Reverend Dr. J.R. Barry that, after his first year of service in 1870, they presented him with a purse of gold worth $300. Upon his leaving in 1887, the church gave him a gift of $5,000.

The church included a roster of townspeople who were integral to the founding and growth of Montclair. From the 17th century through World War II, the Crane family figured prominently in both Montclair's development and the church's growth.

Philip Doremus, whose family ran the largest general store in Montclair during the 19th century and in 1908, helped incorporate Montclair.  Doremus, who wrote a book on Montclair's history, was Superintendent of the church's Sunday school for almost 20 years. In 1856, Doremus hand wrote “A Constitution of the West Bloomfield Presbyterian Sabbath School”. He formed young people's societies for leadership opportunities and a social group for high school age children. He also led a discussion group for college-age adults.

During this time, William B. Bradbury, the famous hymn writer and piano manufacturer used to visit the Sunday school and help teach the children the songs from his own books. When Bradbury was ill and near his death, Mr. Doremus surprised him with a large group of the Sunday school's children who filed in and marched around his room singing the hymns that Bradbury had written.

In 1886, a split in the congregation concerning church policy led to the formation of the Trinity Presbyterian Church. ‘Old First’, however, continued to grow during the years 1888–1900, when Reverend William F. Junkin served. Reverend Junkin, a former Confederate officer, had served as a lieutenant colonel and chaplain on General Stonewall Jackson's staff and served at the General's funeral service. Reverend Junkin passed away in 1900.

From 1901 to 1913, Reverend Llewellyn Stover Fulmer served. He was the last minister to serve ‘Old First’. During this time, Trinity and Old First were engaged in conversations concerning a possible reunification. Reverend Fulmer resigned in 1913 to help bridge the new union when Old First and Trinity reunited.

1913 – The Central Presbyterian Church of Montclair 
On December 2, 1913, Trinity and Old First merged and officially became The Central Presbyterian Church of Montclair. Together, there were 927 members. The Reverend Edmund Melville Wylie served as the first pastor of Central. During his years of service, from 1914 to 1931, Central grew and flourished. The new congregation held services at Trinity's church, located on the northwest corner of Midland and Claremont Avenues.

Central supported missionary work both domestically and around the globe. So prominent was the mission work of Central that the missionaries’ names were featured on the cover of the weekly Sunday service program.

Following is a list of the missionaries supported by Central:
Mr. and Mrs. C.W. McCleary:  Elat Station, West Africa
Miss F. Elizabeth Harris:  Dry Creek, West Virginia
Rev. and Mrs. Alfred William Moore:  Mainpuri, India
Rev. Giacinto J. Reale, Italian Mission:  Montclair, New Jersey

Members engaged in mission work:
Rev. Thomas F. Carter:  Nanhsuchou, China
Dr. Edward Mills Dodd:  Tabriz, Persia
Peter Carter Speers:  Lahore, India
John L. Mott:  Nagpur, India
James L. Speers, Jr.:  Nanking, China
Dr. and Mrs. William S. Dodd:  Konia, Turkey
Marjorie C. Geary:  Czechoslovakia
Dr. Wilson Farnsworth Dodd:  Constantinople, Turkey
Marian Crawford:  Smith, Kentucky
Florence Goodall:  Smith, Kentucky

Mr. and Mrs. C.W. McCleary were the first missionaries supported by Central. In 1903, they went to Cameroon, Elat, West Africa. Although Mr. McCleary died six months after they arrived in West Africa, Mrs. McCleary stayed and taught more than 6,000 boys.

Central supported domestic missions as well. Miss F. Elizabeth Harris rode on horseback over 1,000 miles per year to help the community in Dry Creek, Virginia. Other missions included the Mountaineers School at Rock Creek, Tennessee; the Spring Street Neighborhood House in New York City. The Presbyterian Italian Mission in Montclair provided Italian immigrants with sermons in their native language.

Central's Women's Guild was renowned for its philosophy of service and good works.  During World War I, Central's Women's Guild aided the relief agencies.  The Guild paid Mrs. McCleary's salary in West Africa. They formed a sewing department to make clothes for local charities and missionary requests. ‘The Cut and Contrive Club’ made dresses and coats for children, new suits and clothing for the missionaries. During World War I, the Guild partnered with the Red Cross to sew pajamas, shirts for the wounded, pneumonia jackets, gauze masks and bandages. While Pastor Wylie was away, after having been called to serve at a YMCA training camp in the South, the Guild formed a branch called ‘Group Work’. The groups were divided into districts of 50 families each and the women acted as Big Sisters reporting illness or trouble.

1922 - The Central Presbyterian Church at 46 Park Street 
By 1916, Central had outgrown its building. The ‘Committee of Twelve’ was appointed and chose the site for the church currently at the corner of Park Street and Claremont Avenue. The architectural design company Carrere and Hastings, Shreve, Lamb and Blake Associates was hired. This company also designed the New York Public Library.  

The new church, the same church worshipped in today, is an architectural treasure embodying the simplicity of New England Colonial style with the Georgian style of many English churches. There is seating capacity for 600 people on the main floor and 340 in the balcony. The church's spire was designed as a tribute to the hope and faith of the congregation, not to mention the many hands that helped build it.

Next door is the adjoining church house, built for the many social and religious activities the church hoped to foster. A large gym on the second floor hosted many basketball games and a proscenium stage was designed to host church plays and benefits. Downstairs, the Guild Room was, according to Reverend Wylie,  devoted to the Women's Guild as a “rallying center, a place of beauty of  inspiration and devotion.” The new building had space for 750 Sunday School students! Reverend Wylie decried the enrollment in 1922 at 400 “is but half the number that a School commensurate with the membership of our Church should comprise.”

On October 15, 1922, the new Central Presbyterian Church held its dedication ceremony. At 10:30 a.m., the Gloria Trumpeters, using long trumpets and dressed in ankle-length white robes, stood outside the church portals and played “A Mighty Fortress is Our God”. The doors opened and the congregation filed in.

Reverend Wylie, the new associate pastor Reverend Rock and the officers met at the old church, held a brief service, and then marched to the new building. Before entering the building, they stood outside and sang two verses of the 100th Psalm, “All people that on earth do dwell.” When they marched down the aisles, the entire congregation rose and sang the last two verses with them.

Dr. Cleland B. McAfee from the McCormick Theological Seminary preached the sermon aptly named “The Glory of the House.” The church celebrated with a week's worth of activities including an organ recital, a Young People's Musical Service, and several special services.

Reverend Wylie called the church and adjoining church house “a factory”. There was always something going on. The church was a place where the congregation enjoyed spiritual education, work and play. The church was both a religious retreat and community center – a very different model than the church the forefathers probably had in mind! There was a gym for basketball, badminton, evening parties and dancing; an auditorium-sized stage for plays and programs, and a kitchen for church suppers. The four manual Skinner organ was a gift from the Women's Guild in memory of Mrs. Wylie, the minister's wife, who died unexpectedly in 1919.

From 1927 to 1937, Carl F. Mueller was appointed organist and then Minister of Music. Mueller was already recognized as a masterful organist in his native hometown Milwaukee, Wisconsin. Mueller developed a volunteer choir and steadily over the course of several years built the choir from forty voices to several different choirs totaling 100 voices. Through Mueller's inspired direction, Central's choir became very well known throughout New Jersey and even sang on radio broadcasts.

In 1931, Mueller united the Central Choir with the State Teachers College in Montclair to form the Montclair Acapella Choir. Mr. Mueller wrote and published much of the music sung by the choir. Mueller's choral work, "Create in Me a Clean Heart, O God", sold nearly 2 million copies.

In 1931, citing ill health, Pastor Wylie resigned. The Great Depression was in full force. Central was not immune to the financial upheaval. The budget dropped by 25% causing much consternation and anxiety.

In April, 1932, the Reverend Morgan Phelps Noyes came to Central. A much loved pastor, he served until 1957. By 1937, the church was back on sound financial footing, the manse at 66 Park Street was razed and a house on North Mountain Avenue was leased for the pastor and his family. The membership had grown to 1,018 and the local and international mission work continued.

Reverend Noyes’ service at Central encompassed World War II. During this time, many women from our church volunteered with the Red Cross working in local canteens, aiding nurses, visiting V.A. hospitals and working overseas. After the war, two Central Presbyterian church women were awarded Gold Stars for their work.

When soldiers on leave visited Central, they were often invited for a home-cooked meal. Church members quite regularly corresponded with the soldiers. A scrapbook with thank you letters from the soldiers was kept by the church.

During these years, the Women's Guild continued to meet one Tuesday each month for Guild Day. The women sewed in the morning, ate a luncheon for 25 cents, met for an afternoon business meeting and then enjoyed a program. Speakers on missions and social issues both local and national dominated the programs.

Post World War II 
In 1950, Central ordained its first women elders.  Central member Edna Thistle, the first woman to serve communion at Central, wisely commented: “The significance of this victory for women was not the gaining of power per se but, rather, an affirmation of the responsibility they had assumed through their faithful work, their study, their training, their giving and their worship.”  The first women elders were Lois Dean, Nellie Dodd Speers, and Rose Marzano. Two years later, Lila Speers, Lillian Applegate and Maude Dean were ordained.  

In the early 1950s, due to restrictive budgets and domestic needs, financial support for missionary work abroad had to be curtailed. Central's strong commitment to mission found a new outlet in giving: the nationally based Presbyterian Major Mission Fund. One third of the money went to special domestic and international programs, one third was targeted by donors for ‘use wherever the need was greatest’, and the balance was given without restrictions. Central was known to have exceeded its goal by $20,000 and to have given seven times the national per capita average.

The 1960s 
From 1958 to 1965, Reverend Paul Conine served at Central. At the time, budgetary problems caused a series of cutbacks for the church.

In 1966, Reverend Doctor Roger Huber was called to serve Central. Considered a breath of fresh air by many, he brought many major contemporary issues to the attention of the church membership. Questions about the U.S. involvement in Vietnam, civil rights, women's rights and civil liberties, however, caused much dissension among church members, resulting in a large number of members leaving the church. Reverend Huber remained until 1975. Following a period of poor health, he resigned, went to law school and joined the staff at Seton Hall Law School.

The latter 20th century 
From 1977 through 1987, Reverend Ernie Fogg served as Senior Pastor at Central. Before coming to Central, Reverend Fogg had balanced a career between leading mission efforts in Indonesia and running programs at Presbyterian headquarters at 475 Riverside Avenue in New York city. While at Central, Reverend Fogg mentored a dozen Princeton Theological Seminary students. He was involved with the Montclair Clergy Association, the Montclair Rotary, and Senior Care and Activity Center. Reverend Fogg was National President of the American Leprosy Association. At Central, Ernie excelled at both pastoral calling and organizing memorable worship services. During his time here, a successful Capital Campaign was held to update the kitchen and restore the steeple.

Early in his ministry, Central was one of the leading churches in New Jersey. Central supported the UPC's Major Mission Fund to create educational and medical mission programs here and overseas. His wife, C’lee Fogg, was very active in the church, and the couple were very popular with the congregation.

By the 1980s, Central women were leading Newark presbytery committees. Alice Price, Bessie Marsh, Carole Brand and Mary Lee Fitzgerald led these various committees. Alice Price served as Central's first woman Clerk of Session. From 1985 to 1986, she also served as moderator of the Newark Presbytery. The Sunday school, led by Connie Thurber, Marlene French, Terye McAnally and Liz Ploth, was brimming with creativity, energy and devotion.

From 1976 - 2009,  Central's Choir was led by the inimitable Gaylord French whose talent and artistry filled the church with inspirational music. Gaylord directed the choir and played a classical repertoire. Through the years, Central has attracted superb singers and been the church home to many fine musicians.  Gaylord took advantage of the congregation's musicians, showcased their talents on Sundays, and organized the Family Ensemble, a group who played periodically at church services.  Gaylord performed solo and partnered with guest musicians for Sunday afternoon recitals, the Christmas Pageant and the lively annual Talent Show.  It's impossible to mention Gaylord without giving due attention to his wife Marlene, who also contributed greatly to the Women's Guild.

In 1988, Reverend Dr. N. Barry Dancy served as interim pastor to provide continuity while Central searched for a new pastor. During his year of service, a group of young people from our church went to England to share the news of Christ's peace. A photo exhibit at William Patterson College used Central's church building as an outstanding example of American Renaissance church architecture in New Jersey. In October, Central's sanctuary building was selected for registry as a national historic landmark.

From 1989 – 1996, Reverend Charles Henderson served as pastor. His new wife, Reverend Katharine Rhodes Henderson served as Parish Associate. During his tenure, the church established a Long-Range Committee to help develop a three-year plan to meet the needs of the physical structure of the church. Additionally, the Committee studied and ultimately recommended that Central institute a new system of church government combining the work of Session and the Board of Trustees into one governing body. In 1994, a successful Capital Campaign raised $20,000 more than its target goal of $350,000 for building improvements.

In August, 1997, the Reverend Dr. Richard Crocker began his five and a half year tenure as Pastor of Central. Dr. Crocker's wry, sophisticated sermons, peppered with comments on modern life and the travails of raising a family, were a big hit with the congregation. His wife Carolyn also had a great influence on the Sunday school and the women's group she organized and led.

In 1998, a three-year campaign raised $360,000. A second fund-raiser collected enough money to pay off the mortgage on the manse and for the first time in many years, Central was debt free.

The Early Years of the 21st Century   
In 2000, under the direction of Central's two seminarians, David Baker and Mark Hanna, Central launched a new Young Adult program and ministry. In 2002, seminarian Patricia Hill was hired as Director of Youth and Family Ministry.

Dr. Crocker shepherded the congregation through the dark days following the 9/11 terrorist attacks; but in 2002 he accepted a position as Dean of the Tucker Foundation and Chaplain of Dartmouth College. Two interim pastors served Central while the congregation searched for a permanent pastor. Reverend Ray Vande Giessen and Reverend Phyllis Zoon worked tirelessly to keep our congregation on course while we searched for a new pastor. Their efforts were greatly appreciated.  

In 2004, Reverend Laurie Ann McNeill was installed as Senior Pastor and Head of Staff.  When the local Senior Care and Activities Center moved into a new building after operating for 27 years at Central, Reverend McNeill identified a new mission opportunity.  The church hosted an emergency winter shelter and a summer cooling station, programs sponsored by the Montclair interfaith clergy council and administered by Reverend McNeill.  The Salvation Army, Calvary Chapel, and the Interfaith Hospitality Network nested in Central's expansive buildings at the end of the first decade of the new century. 

In 2014, Reverend David C. Noble became the church's senior pastor until his retirement in 2021.

Central Presbyterian Church pastors and dates of service   
Called Pastors:

1839 - 1843:  Rev. Samuel Ware Fisher

1843 - 1844:  Rev. Nathaniel Emmons Johnson

1845 - 1851:  Rev. Aaron C. Adams

1852 - 1856:  Rev. Job Foster Halsey

1858 - 1861:  Rev. Josiah Addison Priest

1862 - 1867:  Rev. Nelson Millard (took leave to serve in Civil War)

1870 - 1887:  Rev. J. Romeyn Berry

1888 - 1900:  Rev. William F. Junkin

1901 - 1913:  Rev. Llewellyn Stover Fulmer

1914 - 1932:  Rev. Edmund Melville Wylie (first pastor of the merged Central Presbyterian Church)

1932 - 1959:  Rev. Morgan Phelps Noyes (served as Minister Emeritus through 1978)

1958 - 1965:  Rev. Edward Paul Conine

1966 - 1975:  Rev. Dr. Roger A. Huber

1977 - 1987:  Rev. Ernest L. Fogg

1989 - 1996:  Rev. Charles P. Henderson

1997 - 2002:  Rev. Richard R. Crocker

2004 - 2010:  Rev. Laurie A. McNeill

2014 - 2021: Rev. David C. Noble

Assistant and Associate Pastors:

1917 -1920:   Rev. Ivar Hellstrom

1920 - 1925:  Rev. William Woodford Rock

1926 -1929:   Rev. Frank W. Herriott

1929 - 1932:  Rev. Warwick Freeman Kelloway

1941 - 1952:  Rev. Cecil W. Derevan

1952 - 1955:  Rev. Robert H.R. Loughborough

1955 - 1958:  Rev. Leighton Roe

1959 - 1962:  Rev. James Stanley Weaver

1963 - 1964:  Rev. W. George French

1967 - 1971:  Rev. Charles R. Nixon

1976 - 1977:  Rev. Deborah Kapp

1973 – 1977:  Rev. Dr. Purd E. Deitz – Parish Associate

198?           :  Rev. Robert W. Northup - Parish Associate

1986 - 1989:  Rev. Sharon Yunker Deatz

1989 - 1996:  Rev. Katharine Henderson – Parish Associate

199? - 199?:  Rev. Robert Kwik – Parish Associate

Interim Pastors:

1856 - 1858:  Rev. Silas Billings

1867 - 1870:  Various Unnamed Ministers

1890           :   Rev. Orville Reed  (The one pastor of Trinity Church 1888 - 1913 *)

1977 - 1978:  Rev. William Scott Morton

1988 - 1989:  Rev. North Barry Dancy

1996 - 1997:  Rev. Robert L. George

2003           :  Rev. Raymond Vande Giessen

2004           :  Rev. Phyllis Zoon

2011           :  Rev. Ronald W. Johnson

2011 - 2014    :  Samuel and Janice Adams

2022 -         :  Peter Wilkinson

See also 
 National Register of Historic Places listings in Essex County, New Jersey

References

Montclair, New Jersey
Presbyterian churches in New Jersey
Churches on the National Register of Historic Places in New Jersey
Colonial Revival architecture in New Jersey
Churches completed in 1921
20th-century Presbyterian church buildings in the United States
Churches in Essex County, New Jersey
National Register of Historic Places in Essex County, New Jersey
New Jersey Register of Historic Places